Bamma Maata Bangaru Baata is a 1989 Indian Telugu-language comedy film produced by M. Saravan and M. Balasubramanian of AVM Productions and directed by Rajasekhar. It stars Bhanumathi Ramakrishna, Rajendra Prasad, Gautami and Nutan Prasad, with music composed by Chandrabose. The film is a remake of AVM's Tamil film Paatti Sollai Thattathe (1988). Even though critically and commercially acclaimed, this film is infamous for an accident in which Nutan Prasad broke his back. This left him paralysed from the waist down and he had to use a wheelchair.

Plot 
The film is set in a backdrop of a village where an affluent family exists. Suraiah is the village head just for the namesake. Everything is managed by his wife Rajalakshmi. Suriah just roams around the village with empty words and stays under his wife. While the couple had a son and daughter-in-law, they die in an accident and they have a grandson Krishna, who is quite pampered by the grandparents. Krishna is a casual youngster who earns a degree with great difficulty in five years and returns to the village. At this juncture, he meets Seetha on the train. He learns Seetha was forced into a marriage and gives her shelter in Hotel Govindu, in his village. In a dramatic situation when Seetha's life is endangered, he marries her in a police station. Rajalakshmi is devastated by the news and tells her grandson to leave the house. A sad Krishna and Seetha arrive in the city and try to establish their own life. Suraiah comes to the city and things come to an understanding. But the real fun starts when Krishna lies to his grandfather that they have a son. Hearing the good news, Rajalakshmi comes to the city. Krishna gets a baby for rent from Anasuya, who gives children. To make things worse, she gives a girl baby and lies that it is a boy. She even enters the house as a maid to loot the money. Rajalakshmi realizes this and teaches her a lesson.

Cast 

Bhanumathi Ramakrishna as Rajyalakshmamma
Rajendra Prasad as Krishna Murthy / Kishtaiah
Gautami as Seeta
Nutan Prasad as Suraiah
Silk Smitha as Anasuya
Padmanabham as Govindu
Rallapalli as Inspector
Suthi Velu as Lawyer Kukuteswara Rao
Brahmanandam as Lawyer Keerti
Sakshi Ranga Rao as Gumastha
Anandaraj as Goon
Hema Sundar
Potti Prasad
K. K. Sarma
Chidatala Appa Rao
Dham
Preethi as Reetha
Chilakala Radha as Manga
Kalpana Rai

Soundtrack 
Music was composed by Chandrabose. Lyrics were written by Veturi.

References

External links 
 

1980s Telugu-language films
1989 comedy films
1989 films
AVM Productions films
Films directed by Rajasekhar (director)
Films scored by Chandrabose (composer)
Indian comedy films
Telugu remakes of Tamil films